Karvir Assembly constituency is one of the 288 Vidhan Sabha (legislative assembly) constituencies of Maharashtra state, western India. This constituency is located in Kolhapur district.

Geographical scope
The constituency comprises Gagan Bavda taluka, Bajar Bhogaon and Kale revenue circles of Panhala taluka, Kuditre, Nigave, Dumala, Haladi, Beed and Sangarul revenue circles of Karvir taluka.

Members of Legislative Assembly

References

Assembly constituencies of Kolhapur district
Assembly constituencies of Maharashtra